is a retrograde irregular satellite of Jupiter. The moon was discovered on 5 February 2003 by a team of astronomers from the University of Hawaii led by Scott S. Sheppard and David C. Jewitt, and was later announced on 4 March 2003. It was initially thought to be Jupiter's outermost known moon until recovery observations disproved this in 2020.

The moon was initially assumed to be part of the Pasiphae group, but is now known to be part of the Ananke group after it was recovered in 2020.

The moon was considered lost until 2020, when it was recovered by Sheppard and independently by amateur astronomer Kai Ly. The recovery of the moon was announced by the Minor Planet Center on 26 January 2021.

References

Moons of Jupiter
Irregular satellites
20030305
Ananke group
Discoveries by Scott S. Sheppard
Moons with a retrograde orbit